The Central District of Khaf County is a district (bakhsh) in Khaf County, Razavi Khorasan province, Iran. At the 2006 census, its population was 40,652, in 9,114 families.  The district has two cities: Khaf and Nashtifan. The district has two rural districts (dehestan): Miyan Khaf Rural District and Nashtifan Rural District.

References 

Districts of Razavi Khorasan Province
Khaf County